Pursuit is a 2015 Irish crime thriller film written and directed by Paul Mercier. The film stars Ruth Bradley, Barry Ward, Liam Cunningham and Brendan Gleeson among an ensemble cast of Irish actors.

Plot
Pursuit is a modern-day gangland retelling of the ancient Irish legend of The Pursuit of Diarmuid and Gráinne. Gráinne is daughter of a major crime boss and is promised in marriage Fionn, one of his lieutenants, to help cement an alliance. However, she's in love with Fionn's bodyguard Diarmuid, and her actions set off a wild chase across the country.

Cast
 Ruth Bradley as Gráinne
 Barry Ward as Diarmuid
 Brendan Gleeson as Searbhán
 Owen Roe as Mr. King
 Liam Cunningham as Fionn

Release
Pursuit premiered at the 28th annual Galway Film Fleadh on July 10, 2015. It was screened for Irish President Michael D. Higgins on September 9, 2015. It went on general release in IMC Cinemas across Ireland on September 18, 2015.

Pursuit received its network premiere on TV3 on March 20, 2016.

References

External links
 

2015 films
Films set in Ireland
2015 crime thriller films
Irish crime thriller films
2010s English-language films